The Daliang Mountains are in the southern part of the province of Sichuan in China.  The Daliang rises above the left bank of the Jinsha (Upper Yangtze) River, opposite the Wulian Feng in Yunnan Province.  This part of the Jinsha River is the last portion to flow through mountainous terrain before entering the Sichuan Basin where the river becomes known as the Yangtze at Yibin.  The Daliang are located within eastern Liangshan Prefecture, southern Leshan Prefecture, and western Yibin Prefecture.

The Chengdu–Kunming Railway passes to the west of Daliang Range, below the Xiaoxiang Range.

References

Mountain ranges of Sichuan